Westfield Doncaster (formerly Doncaster Shoppingtown) is a shopping centre 50% owned by Scentre Group and 25% owned by ISPT and 25% owned by Asia Property Fund (as of May 2015) located in Doncaster, a suburb of Melbourne, Victoria, Australia. As of July 2014, the Westfield Group became two companies Scentre Group and Westfield Corporation. The Westfield Group portion is now owned by Scentre Group. It is located on the corner of Williamsons Road and Doncaster Road in the Doncaster Hill precinct, an ongoing planning initiative by the local Manningham council. It is located 20 minutes east of the CBD and is one of the biggest shopping centres in Victoria.

History
Westfield Doncaster officially opened on 30 September 1969, it was Westfield's first entry to Victoria. 

The original $12-million centre consisted of the four-storey Myer department store at the north end, two levels of shops running along the west side to the, then white, eight-storey office tower.  On the east side the two layers of shops merged into one layer, then finished at a Coles New World supermarket. 

In 1979, the centre was extended south with two single-storey rows of shops; Kmart, Coles and Village Twin Cinemas. A major redevelopment completed in 1993 saw the centre expand further.  A second level of shops was added to the south end including Franklins and a fresh food court above Coles and Kmart. However, as the 21st century arrived, time had dulled the looks of the centre following redevelopments of other Westfield centres such as Westfield Southland, Fountain Gate and even Sydney's Bondi Junction.

The latest revitalisation, which began in January 2007, after years of applying for a permit, saw the centre undergo a full makeover. It involved an overall modernisation of the centre, renovated Coles and Safeway (now Woolworths) supermarkets plus a Fresh Food market (Colonial Fresh Markets), new Big W and Target (replacing Kmart), refurbished Myer, new David Jones, a Borders store (now closed), many new mini majors such as JB Hi-Fi, Dick Smith (now closed), a larger 9 screen Village Cinemas, a black label Fitness First Gym which replaced the old Doncaster library (now located at MC Square, near Manningham's council offices), a new food court known as the Drum located on the corner of Williamsons and Doncaster Roads which has sweeping views of Melbourne, new restaurants on the rooftop level, a new bus interchange and over 1500 extra parking spaces , mostly undercover, in a new 6 level parking lot with an LED system indicating free spaces. This unfortunately for Doncaster residents showed the start of paid parking, but at a very low price (first 3 hours free). The number of stores was doubled to 400, which makes it the 9th biggest shopping centre in Australia and 5th biggest in Victoria in terms of stores.  It also made the centre the 18th biggest shopping centre in Australia and 7th biggest in Victoria according to gross lettable area.  It was finished on 16 October 2008.

2007–08 redevelopment

Westfield Doncaster's third redevelopment started with planning approval in May 2004, preliminary works taking place at the centre from September to December 2006, which provided a platform for the main construction works that commenced on 15 January 2007. Doncaster Hill developers met several times with City Council over the next twelve months to discuss creating more sustainable buildings for the community, however little became of the idea of a self-sustaining precinct. It is uncertain whether the wind turbines used at the Manningham Civic Precinct are suitable for powering other buildings. The upgrade was finally completed in October 2008 with the centre doubling the previous size, costing A$650 million.

The new Westfield Doncaster now features more than 200 new retailers for a total around 400, a Village Cinemas complex and dining areas that take advantage of the site's elevated views towards the city skyline. The works required the closure of around 100 stores during 2007 and early 2008, with Myer the only major store remaining open throughout the project, except for a short period when the store itself was refurbished.

Due to the revitalisation, Kmart shut down and was replaced by two new discount department stores – Big W and Target. Coles and Safeway both closed in January 2007 and both supermarkets re-opened on Thursday 10 April 2008. Target and Big W were both expected to open on 18 June 2008, however both these openings were pushed back to Thursday 7 August 2008. The Village Twin Cinemas on Williamsons Road were demolished in September 2006 to make way for a multi-level car park, now open, with new cinemas to open above. The Westfield Shoppingtown Library was also demolished and moved to a temporary location in the Municipal Offices. Since then, the Manningham council has decided to permanently relocate it to the council's civic precinct (Precinct One) rather than return it to Westfield Doncaster. 

Arrivals included a new David Jones department store, a Big W and a Target store – all in the second half of 2008. Other features included a new JB Hi-Fi and expanded dining areas including rooftop restaurants and gourmet fresh food shops. The new Village Cinemas complex on the rooftop level includes Gold Class cinemas. The centre now has improved access, mostly undercover parking and new landscaping.

On 10 April 2008, the first stage opening saw a much larger Coles supermarket (latest format) and Woolworths supermarket (2010 store format including self-serve checkouts) return to their old locations at the south (Doncaster Rd) end, alongside 70-plus other new and returning retailers, including a large-format Colonial Fresh Markets, which opened next to Coles. Some retailers are opening their first stores, including Jones The Grocer, which opened its first Melbourne store, OxFam opening its first food store and That Store.

Westfield Doncaster also introduced a new service called Westfield Butler to assist those unable to physically shop at the centre. A group of six butlers will do different tasks, from grocery shopping, to planning weddings or functions. Delivery is available at the cost of either 20% of the order value or 10 dollars. Another of the centre's offerings is Westfield Gizmo, an expensive service which offers customers a technology installation, upgrade or maintenance service. Staff are titled "gizmotechs", and can arrange both home visits or to assist shoppers choosing technology in the centre at a fixed price. 

Big W opened on the second floor on 7 August at the east side of the centre near where David Jones opened in October, to the east of Myer. Underneath the Big W location, the new Target store opened on the 1st level. 25 other stores also opened in this third stage opening. Most previous food court operators closed in late January 2007. The new dining area, named 'The Drum', with over 900-seat capacity, opened on 26 June 2008 in a new location overlooking the corner of Doncaster and Williamsons Rds. It features 18 new food stores with different types of foods. The Fitness First Platinum gym also opened on 14 August, one week after the stage 3 opening of Big W and Target.

In February 2008, a temporary bus interchange opened closer to Willamsons Road.  This was to make way for changes to the centre entrance and an upgraded bus interchange. The new bus interchange has been mostly finished.

The revitalisation of Westfield Doncaster is now complete, with the last stage opened on 16 October. In this last stage, David Jones opened next to Myer, which reopened after a major refurbishment, the dining precinct on the rooftop level, a larger Village Cinemas opened above the Williamsons Road multideck carpark to replace the twin cinemas and the final carpark area next to David Jones opened. The new Village Cinemas complex features a total of nine auditoriums incorporating three Gold Class cinemas, one huge 22m Vmax screen featuring stadium seating and Dolby Digital surround sound, and one Europa cinema dedicated to fine film; offering a total of 1,755 seats. A new, two-level Borders store also opened at Westfield Doncaster on 4 December, however it's now closed and has been replaced by Rebel Sport. The corner of Williamsons Road and Doncaster Road is complete with the signature glass drum and the red "wave wall" also done. Painting of the Myer Building and the Office Tower also have given these buildings a more modern look to match the rest of the revamped centre. Modernisation of the western entrances to the centre wave also been completed.

Further expansion 
In July 2016, Westfield submitted a $500 million expansion masterplan, aimed at competing against other shopping centres such as Eastland Shopping Centre to the City of Manningham and to the Minister for Planning (see First Andrews Ministry) for approval to expand by nearly a third with substantial car parking, and build a 14 story tower taller than the existing office tower that may stand out over the skyline. The plan would add 43,000 sqm of retail floor space and 18,000 sqm of office floor space (north of the existing building), add 2,793 more car parking spaces (to make a total of 7,575 spaces), building a 14 storey "gateway tower" on a 2 storey podium, reconfigure the bus interchange and move the main vehicle entrance on Williamsons Road further north. This was approved on 20 May 2019 by the state government, with the Minister for Planning (see Second Andrews Ministry) Richard Wynne claiming 2,000 jobs will be created during construction, and 2,900 full and part time positions will be created upon completion.

Kmart returned to the centre in mid 2021, replacing Target which closed permanently on 20 March 2021.

Doncaster Dining 

In November 2020, a new rooftop dining precinct, Doncaster Dining, was opened during Victoria's second COVID-19 lockdown. At a cost of $30 million, the existing second floor (in the southern section of the shopping centre, near Doncaster Road) and a section of the car park near Village Cinemas was renovated to include 12 new shops and remake 2 existing shops. The stores include TGI Fridays, an American grill; Dohtonbori, named in reference to Dōtonbori with its second Australian restaurant; Lanzhou Noodle House; and Little Bangkok Thai amongst others.

Public transport
The shopping centre is serviced by a number of bus routes. These routes utilise the major bus interchange on the Williamsons Road side of the shopping centre, serving as a major hub for transport activity in the Doncaster region. The 907 SmartBus, which provides a frequent, direct route to the city, doesn't enter the interchange, using stops next to the centre on Doncaster Road instead.

Throughout the 1970s the Doncaster line was mooted to run down the middle of the Eastern Freeway, with a station at Westfield Doncaster. By 1984 land for the line once it left the freeway had been sold, and by 1991 an independent report investigating construction of the line recommended against it due to the high cost of underground construction. Various plans have also been made for extension of tram route 48 north from Balwyn North to Doncaster.
A 2008 report released by pt4me2 (a local group pushing for rail transit in Manningham) suggests a $5 billion budget for the public transport to make all train services run every 10 minutes and introduce a Doncaster rail line, branching off from Clifton Hill.

Gallery

See also
 List of shopping centres in Australia
 Proposed Melbourne rail extensions

References

Doncaster Shopping Town – Only Melbourne

External links

 
 Doncaster Hill 20 year strategy

Westfield Group
Shopping centres in Melbourne
Shopping malls established in 1969
Buildings and structures in the City of Manningham
1969 establishments in Australia